Achilles Football Club is a football club based in Ipswich, Suffolk, England.

History
The club was established in 1937 by a merger of St Clements United and St Clements Institute and initially played at Murray Road. They joined the Ipswich & District League (now the Suffolk & Ipswich League), winning the title in 1943–44, 1945–46 (shared with ) and 1948–49. They entered the FA Cup in 1948–49 and 1949–50, but failed to advance beyond the second qualifying round. At the time, they also played in the FA Amateur Cup.

In the late 1960s the club moved to its present ground at Pauls Social Club. They won the league again in 1985–86 and 1987–88, a season in which they also won the League Cup. The club won its sixth league title in 2013–14.

Honours
Suffolk & Ipswich League
Senior Division champions 1943–44, 1945–46 (shared), 1948–49, 1985–86, 1987–88, 2013–14
League Cup winners 1987–88

Records
FA Cup
Second Qualifying Round 1948–49

See also
Achilles F.C. players

References

External links
Club website
Achilles Suffolk & Ipswich League

Football clubs in England
Football clubs in Suffolk
Association football clubs established in 1937
Sport in Ipswich
1937 establishments in England
Suffolk and Ipswich Football League